Pinturas Superior may refer to:

 Pinturas Superior (Ecuador), an Ecuadorian paints brand
 Pinturas Superior (Puerto Rico), a Puerto Rican paint brand